Elkov–Kasper is a UCI Continental road bicycle racing team based in Czech Republic and participates on the UCI Europe Tour. The sponsors of the team are Elkov, an electrical company, and Kasper, a steel manufacturer. The team was one of the best cycling teams before the lifting of the Iron Curtain. The team became professional in 2000. The best known riders for the team were Alois Kaňkovský and Tomáš Bucháček. For the 2008 season the German sprinter André Schulze came from the Wiesenhof team and also Czech cyclist Ondřej Sosenka, a former World Hour Record holder, joined the team.

Team roster

Major wins 

2000
Stage 2 Vuelta a Cuba, Lubomír Kejval
Stage 13 Vuelta a Cuba, Petr Herman
Stage 10 Course de la Paix, Ondřej Sosenka
GP ZTS Dubnica, Petr Herman
Stage 1 Tour de Serbie, Petr Herman
Stage 4 & 5 Tour de Serbie, Lubor Tesař
 Road Race Championship, Lubomír Kejval
 Time Trial Championship, Ondřej Sosenka
Overall Bohemia Tour, Ondřej Sosenka
Stage 3, Ondřej Sosenka
Stages 1 & 2 Okolo Slovenska, Lubomír Kejval
2001
Brno–Velká Bíteš–Brno, Petr Herman
Overall Okolo Slovenska, František Trkal
Stage 2, František Trkal
Stage 3, Lubomír Kejval
2003
Stage 5 Bałtyk–Karkonosze Tour, František Raboň
2004
Stage 9 Tour du Maroc, František Raboň
 Road Race Championship, Martin Riška
Overall Tour of Małopolska, Ondřej Fadrny
Stage 1, Ondřej Fadrny
Stage 2 Okolo Slovenska, Martin Riška
Stage 8 Tour de l'Avenir, Martin Mareš
2005
Stage 3 The Paths of King Nikola, František Raboň
Memoriał Andrzeja Trochanowskiego, František Raboň
Grand Prix Bradlo, Martin Riška
Stage 1 Dookoła Mazowsza, Jan Faltýnek
Stage 1 Tour of Małopolska, František Raboň
Stage 1 Okolo Slovenska, Martin Riška
Stage 4a Okolo Slovenska, František Raboň
Stage 5 Okolo Slovenska, Radek Blahut
2006
Stage 1 Istrian Spring Trophy, Jan Faltýnek
Stage 2 Istrian Spring Trophy, Martin Riška
Stage 1 Tour of Greece, Martin Riška
Stage 4 Presidential Cycling Tour of Turkey, Giorgios Tentsos
 Road Race Championship, Stanislav Kozubek
Stage 6 Dookoła Mazowsza, René Andrle
Memoriał Henryka Łasaka, Petr Benčík
Stage 5 Okolo Slovenska, Stanislav Kozubek
Stage 7 Tour of Bulgaria, Radek Blahut
Stage 9 Tour of Bulgaria, Tomáš Bucháček
2007
Stage 2 Circuit des Ardennes, Tomáš Bucháček
Stage 2 Tour du Loir-et-Cher, Tomáš Bucháček
GP Palma, Petr Benčík
 Time Trial Championship, Giorgios Tentsos
 Road Race Championship, Tomáš Bucháček
 Time Trial Championship, Stanislav Kozubek
Stage 7 Tour of Qinghai Lake, Martin Mareš
Praha–Karlovy Vary–Praha, Stanislav Kozubek
2008
Stage 2 Szlakiem Grodów Piastowskich, André Schulze
 Road Race Championship, Petr Benčík
Stages 1 & 6 Course de la Solidarité Olympique, André Schulze
2009
Stage 3 Presidential Cycling Tour of Turkey, André Schulze
 Road Race Championship, Martin Mareš
Stage 1 Course de la Solidarité Olympique, Matthias Friedemann
Stage 5 Course de la Solidarité Olympique, Danilo Hondo
Overall Sachsen Tour, Patrik Sinkewitz
Stage 3, Patrik Sinkewitz
Stage 3 Volta a Portugal, Patrik Sinkewitz
Stage 7 Volta a Portugal, Danilo Hondo
Praha–Karlovy Vary–Praha, Danilo Hondo
2010
Memoriał Andrzeja Trochanowskiego, André Schulze
Stage 4 Szlakiem Grodów Piastowskich, André Schulze
Overall Oberösterreichrundfahrt, Leopold König
Stage 1, Leopold König
 Road Race Championships, Petr Benčík
Stage 2, 3 & 6 Course de la Solidarité Olympique, André Schulze
Stage 3 Tour of Bulgaria, Leopold König
2011
Stage 4 Tour du Loir-et-Cher, Tomáš Bucháček
Overall Oberösterreichrundfahrt, Petr Benčík
Stage 1, Petr Benčík
 Road Race Championships, Petr Benčík
 Time Trial Championships, Jiří Hudeček
Stage 1 Course de la Solidarité Olympique, Tomáš Bucháček
Overall Czech Cycling Tour, Stanislav Kozubek
2012
Overall Czech Cycling Tour, František Paďour
Stage 1, Team time trial
Stage 4, Matej Jurčo
2014
Stage 1 Course de la Paix U23, Przemysław Kasperkiewicz
Stage 2 Oberösterreichrundfahrt, Paweł Cieślik
 Time Trial Championship, David Dvorský
Grand Prix Královéhradeckého kraje, Paweł Cieślik
2015
Memoriał Romana Siemińskiego, Alois Kaňkovský
Visegrad 4 Bicycle Race – GP Hungary, Alois Kaňkovský
Visegrad 4 Bicycle Race – GP Slovakia, Alois Kaňkovský
Stage 3 Course de la Solidarité Olympique, Alois Kaňkovský
Memoriał Henryka Łasaka, Alois Kaňkovský
Stage 1 East Bohemia Tour, Alois Kaňkovský
2016
Memoriał Andrzeja Trochanowskiego, Alois Kaňkovský
Stage 2 Szlakiem Grodów Piastowskich, Alois Kaňkovský
Memorial Grundmanna I Wizowskiego, Vojtěch Hačecký
Puchar Ministra Obrony Narodowej, Alois Kaňkovský
2017
Visegrad 4 Bicycle Race – GP Slovakia, Alois Kaňkovský
Memoriał Andrzeja Trochanowskiego, Alois Kaňkovský
Memorial Romana Sieminskiego, Alois Kaňkovský
Stage 3 Course Cycliste de Solidarnosc et des Champions Olympiques, Alois Kaňkovský
Overall Dookoła Mazowsza, Alois Kaňkovský
Stages 1 & 4, Alois Kaňkovský
Overall Czech Cycling Tour, Josef Černý
Stage 1 (TTT) 
Stage 3, Josef Černý
2018
Stage 2 Tour du Loir et Cher E Provost, Alois Kaňkovský
Visegrad 4 Bicycle Race–GP Czech Republic, Alois Kaňkovský
Memoriał Andrzeja Trochanowskiego, Alois Kaňkovský
Memorial Romana Sieminskiego, Alois Kaňkovský
Stage 2 CCC Tour - Grody Piastowskie, Alois Kaňkovský
Prologue Gemenc Grand Prix, Michael Kukrle
Stage 2 Gemenc Grand Prix, Alois Kaňkovský 
 Road Race Championships, Josef Černý
 Time Trial Championship, Josef Černý
 U23 Time Trial Championship, Jakub Otruba
Stage 3 Dookoła Mazowsza, Alois Kaňkovský 
Overall Okolo Jižních Čech, Michael Kukrle
Stage 2, Alois Kaňkovský
Stage 4, Josef Černý
2019
Trofej Umag, Alois Kaňkovský 
Tour du Loir et Cher E Provost, Jan Bárta
Visegrad 4 Bicycle Race Grand Prix Poland, Alois Kaňkovský 
Memoriał Andrzeja Trochanowskiego, Alois Kaňkovský 
Memoria Romana Sieminskiego, Alois Kaňkovský 
Visegrad 4 Bicycle Race- GP Slovakia, Alois Kaňkovský 
Stage 3 Cycling Tour of Bihor, Alois Kaňkovský 
Prologue Tour de Hongrie, Jan Bárta
Stage 3b Tour de Hongrie, Alois Kaňkovský 
 Time Trial Championship, Jan Bárta
 U23 Time Trial Championship, Jakub Otruba
Stage 3 Tour Alsace, Michal Schlegel
2020
 U23 Time Trial Championship, Jakub Otruba
 Road Race Championship, Adam Ťoupalík
2021
 Overall Tour of Małopolska, Michal Schlegel
Stage 1, Michal Schlegel
Stage 2 Oberösterreich Rundfahrt, Michal Schlegel
 Road Race Championship, Michael Kukrle
Stage 4 Course Cycliste de Solidarnosc et des Champions Olympiques, Jan Bárta
GP Hungary, Michal Schlegel
GP Czech Republic, Adam Ťoupalík
Memoriał Henryka Łasaka, Michael Kukrle
2022
Stage 2 Circuit des Ardennes, Michael Kukrle
 Overall Tour du Loir-et-Cher, Michael Kukrle
Stage 1, Daniel Babor
 Overall Tour du Pays de Montbéliard, Michael Kukrle
Prologue, Michael Kukrle
 Time Trial Championship, Jan Bárta
 Road Race Championship, Matěj Zahálka
GP Czech Republic, Adam Ťoupalík
GP Hungary, Adam Ťoupalík
Memoriał Jana Magiery, Michael Boroš
Stages 2 & 5 Tour of Romania, Daniel Babor
Stage 4 Tour of Romania, Jakub Otruba

National Champions

2000
 Czech Road Race, Lubomír Kejval
 Czech Time Trial, Ondřej Sosenka

2004
 Slovak Road Race, Martin Riška

2006
 Czech Road Race Stanislav Kozubek

2007
 Greek Time Trial, Giorgios Tentsos
 Czech Road Race, Tomáš Bucháček
 Czech Time Trial, Stanislav Kozubek

2008
 Czech Road Race, Petr Benčík

2009
 Czech Road Race, Martin Mareš

2010
 Czech Road Race, Petr Benčík

2011
 Czech Road Race, Petr Benčík
 Czech Time Trial, Jiří Hudeček

2014
 Czech U23 Time Trial, David Dvorský

2018
 Czech Road Race, Josef Černý
 Czech Time Trial, Josef Černý
 Czech U23 Time Trial, Jakub Otruba

2019
 Czech Time Trial, Jan Bárta
 Czech U23 Time Trial, Jakub Otruba

2020
 Czech U23 Time Trial, Jakub Otruba
 Czech Road Race, Adam Ťoupalík

2021
 Czech Road Race, Michael Kukrle

2022
 Czech Time Trial, Jan Bárta
 Czech Road Race, Matěj Zahálka

References

External links

Team for 2008

UCI Continental Teams (Europe)
Cycling teams based in the Czech Republic
Cycling teams established in 2000
Former UCI Professional Continental teams